Ken Woodard (born  January 22, 1960 in Detroit, Michigan)  is a former linebacker who played eight seasons in the NFL.

1960 births
Living people
American football linebackers
Denver Broncos players
Pittsburgh Steelers players
San Diego Chargers players
Tuskegee University alumni
Tuskegee Golden Tigers football players